Bartonella bovis is a pathogenic bacteria first isolated from European ruminants. It is small, fastidious, aerobic, oxidase-negative, gram-negative and rod-shaped. Its type strain is 91-4T (= CIP 106692T = CCUG 43828T).

References

Further reading

External links

LPSN
The Western Producer article
Type strain of Bartonella bovis at BacDive -  the Bacterial Diversity Metadatabase

Bartonellaceae
Bacteria described in 2002